Wat Pa Ban Tat (alternative spelling: Wat Pa Baan Taad; Thai วัดป่าบ้านตาด) is a Theravada Buddhist monastery (Wat), located in the Udon Thani Province of Thailand. Wat Pa Ban Tat was founded by a Thai meditation Bhikkhu, Ajahn Maha Bua.

History 

In 1950, Ajahn Maha Bua was living in the Huey Sai village, in what is now Mukdahan Province. He then learned that his mother was ill and so returned to his village near Udon Thani to look after her. Back at home, villagers and relatives requested that he settle in the forested area south of the village. They also asked him to make his residence permanent. Considering that his mother was very old and that it was appropriate for him to look after her, he accepted the offer and began to build this monastery in November 1955. It was named Wat Pa Ban Tat.

"This monastery has always been a place for meditation. Since the beginning it has been a place solely for developing the mind. I haven‘t let any other work disturb the place. If there are things which must be done, I‘ve made it a rule that they take up no more time than is absolutely necessary. The reason for this is that, in the eyes of the world and the Dhamma, this is a meditation temple. We‘re meditation monks. The work of the meditation monk was handed over to him on the day of his ordination by his Preceptor - in all its completeness. This is his real work, and it was taught in a form suitable for the small amount of time available during the ordination ceremony - five meditation objects to be memorized in forward and reverse order - and after that it‘s up to each individual to expand on them and develop them to whatever degree of breadth or subtlety he is able to. In the beginning the work of a monk is given simply as: Kesa - hair of the head, Loma - hair of the body, Nakha - nails, Danta - teeth, Taco - the skin which enwraps the body. This is the true work for those monks who practice according to the principles of Dhamma as were taught by the Lord Buddha.“

Relics of Ariyas 

In a display case, there are urns containing the relics of Ajahn Sao Kantasilo Mahathera, Ajahn Mun, and Acariya Sing Khatayakhamo of Wat Pa Salawan. There are also pictures of Acariya Waen Suchinno, Venerable Acariya Khao Analayo, Venerable Ajahn Lee Dhammadharo of Wat Asokaram, and Venerable Ajahn Fun Ajaro.

References

External links 
Luang Ta Maha Bua
The Dhamma of Ajaan Panyavaddho

See also 

Wat Pah Nanachat
Wat Aranyawiwake
Ajahn Maha Bua
Ajahn Mun

Pa Ban Tat